Hannes Van Dahl (born Karl-Hannes Dahl, 18 January 1990) is a Swedish musician. He is best known as the drummer of the heavy metal band Sabaton.

Life 
Dahl changed his name to "Hannes Van Dahl" as an adult. His interest in rock and metal music came from the skateboarding scene and a big inspiration was his cousin who played in a local band and his mother playing records to him from young age. At the age of 10 he started playing the bass guitar but quickly lost interest and moved on to the drums. His first band was called "The Motherfuckers".

Later he started the band Downthrust and ended this engagement to join Evergrey in 2009 while replacing Jonas Ekdahl.
Van Dahl's drumming teacher Snowy Shaw, after seeing the potential in him, recommended Van Dahl for Evergrey.  During Shaw's engagement as Sabaton drummer, Van Dahl joined Shaw as a drum tech for four shows.

After a rehearsal in The Abyss, he joined Sabaton as an official band member during the Swedish Empire Tour in 2013.
In 2014, Sabaton released the Album Heroes, which was the first Sabaton album Hannes Van Dahl recorded with the band.

Van Dahl is married to Nightwish lead vocalist Floor Jansen. Their daughter Freja was born on 15 March 2017. He can play the guitar and skateboards during his quality time. Together with Tommy Johansson, Thobbe Englund and Chris Rörland, he is in the band The Last Heroes.

Discography

With Evergrey 
 Glorious Collision (2011)

With Sabaton 
 Heroes (2014)
 Heroes on Tour (2016)
 The Last Stand (2016)
 The Great War (2019)
 The War to End All Wars (2022)

As a guest 
 With Biff Byford, Eric Peterson, Cecilia Nappo and Jay Jay French: Spin the Wheel (2021)

References 

Swedish heavy metal drummers
Musicians from Gothenburg
1990 births
Living people